Franklin Jeremiah Drake (4 March 1846 – 30 January 1929) was a Rear Admiral in the United States Navy. He fought in the American Civil War and the United States expedition to Korea.

Drake was a descendant of the Royal Navys Admiral Sir Bernard Drake (c. 1537–1586).

Naval career
Drake was born on 4 March 1846 at Yates in Orleans County, New York. He served in the U.S. Navy as an enlisted man in the North Atlantic Squadron, participating aboard the sloop-of-war  in the Union blockade of the Confederate States of America and in hunting Confederate privateers during the American Civil War. Appointed a midshipman on 23 February 1863 by competitive examination from New York's 31st congressional district, Drake attended the United States Naval Academy in Annapolis, Maryland. He performed duty aboard the steamer  in 1865 and participated in practice cruises aboard the frigate  and the sloop-of-war  in 1867 before graduating on 2 June 1868. He was promoted to ensign on 19 April 1869.

Drake initially performed duty in the West Indies in 1868, then served aboard the gunboat  from 1868 to 1869 and aboard the steamer  in 1869 and was promoted to ensign on 19 April 1869. He temporarily transferred to the United States Army from 1869 to 1870 for training and service as a signals officer, was promoted to master on 12 July 1870, and returned to Navy service as fleet signal officer of the Asiatic Squadron aboard the squadrons flagship, the screw frigate , from 1870 to 1871. In 1871, he served aboard the screw sloop-of-war  in the Asiatic Squadron and commanded Company B in the land assault on Korean fortifications at Seoul during the American expedition to Korea of that year, and was commended for his actions by the commander of the landing force, Commander Lewis Kimberly.

Drake was aboard the sidewheel gunboat  in 1872, was promoted to lieutenant on 15 November 1872, and returned for a second tour aboard USS Colorado from 1872 to 1873. He was at the Naval Torpedo Station at Newport, Rhode Island, in 1873, and later that year was aboard the monitor  in the North Atlantic Squadron. He served aboard the sloop-of-war  in the Pacific Squadron from in 1874, transferring to the steamer  of the same squadron later that year.

In 1875, Drake reported for duty aboard , the receiving ship at the Mare Island Navy Yard in Vallejo, California. From 1875 to 1876, he was a member of the navy yards ordnance department. From 1876 to 1878, he served aboard the United States Coast Survey steamer Hassler on surveying duty along the northwest coast of the United States and in 1878 was aboard the sidewheel steam frigate  in the North Atlantic Squadron.

From 1878 to 1881, Drake was on special service aboard the screw sloop-of-war  while she made a voyage around the world. During the voyage, he led a surveying expedition to Liberia in 1879 which mapped out the headwaters of the Saint John River and in the spring of 1880 conducted a reconnaissance of the Congo River during which he concluded a treaty with tribal chiefs along the south shore of the river between its mouth and its lower falls.

After returning to the United States, Drake was assigned to the New York Navy Yard at Brooklyn, New York, from 1881 to 1882, then had special duty from 1883 to 1885 on the first Advisory Board and as inspector of materiel in the U.S. Navys construction of its first steel ships. He went to sea, serving in the European Squadron from 1885 to 1887, first aboard the screw steamer  in 1885 and then on the screw corvette  from 1886 to 1887. From 1889 to 1891 he was inspector of construction for the Howell Automobile Torpedo, and in 1892 he had special duty at the Bureau of Ordnance for upcoming the World's Columbian Exhibition. In 1893 he was assistant inspector of construction for the new protected cruiser , then being built at Columbian Iron Works in Baltimore, Maryland. He was promoted to lieutenant commander on 1 October 1893.

Drake returned to sea as commanding officer of the United States Fish Commission steamer Albatross in 1894. During his tour, Albatross  completed the exploration of the seabed in the Bering Sea, studied the extent and flow of currents and their effect on the ice pack in and north of the Bering Strait, surveyed the Pribilof Islands, and studied the habitat of the fur seal and extent of the sealing belt in the area. He detached from Albatross in 1896 and reported aboard the new battleship  in June 1896 as her executive officer. He remained aboard Oregon from her commissioning in July 1896 until 22 August 1897, and was credited with the training and development of the fighting efficiency of her crew that in 1898 allowed her to make her famous voyage from the Pacific Ocean to the Caribbean Sea and perform with great success in the Battle of Santiago de Cuba during the Spanish–American War.

After detaching from Oregon, Drake became inspector of ordnance at the Mare Island Navy Yard. During his tour there, he also oversaw the manufacture of gunpowder at the California Powder Works and conducted experiments to test the stability and keeping qualities of the Navys new smokeless powder; he received a letter of thanks from Commodore George Dewey for the quality of ammunition supplied to the Asiatic Squadron during the Spanish–American War. In May 1898, he took up additional duty as commanding officer of the screw steamer  at the navy yard while retaining his position as inspector of ordnance, and was promoted to commander on 3 March 1899. In May 1900 received preliminary orders to command the steam sloop-of-war  as a training ship.

Drake detached from Mare Island Navy Yard on 12 December 1900 and proceeded to duty in the Asiatic Squadron, where he took command of the refrigerated stores ship  on 17 March 1901. Detaching from Culgoa at Manila in Philippine Islands on 27 May 1901, he was ordered to Cavite Navy Yard at Cavite before taking command of the monitor  on 8 July 1901.

Drake was commanding officer of the battleship  from 14 December 1904 until November 1906. He retired from the Navy on 10 December 1906.

Personal life
Drake was married to the former Martha J. V. McCarthy (1858–1912). He was an Original Companion of the Military Order of the Loyal Legion of the United States.

Later career and death
From 1913 to 1915, Drake served as a technical expert for the Permanent Court of Arbitration at The Hague in the Netherlands.

Drake died in Washington, D.C., on 30 January 1929. He is buried with his wife at Arlington National Cemetery in Arlington, Virginia.

Notes

References
 Naval History and Heritage Command: Officers of the Continental and U.S. Navy and Marine Corps, 1775–1900.
 Hamersly, Lewis Randolph. The Records of Living Officers of the U.S. Navy and Marine Corps, Fourth Edition, Philadelphia: L. R. Hamersly & Company, 1890.
 Hamersly, Lewis Randolph. The Records of Living Officers of the U.S. Navy and Marine Corps, Seventh Edition, New York: L. R. Hamersly Company, 1902, p. 159.

External links
 
 Franklin J. Drake at ArlingtonCemetery.net, an unofficial website
 

United States Navy rear admirals
United States Naval Academy alumni
Union Navy sailors
American military personnel of the Spanish–American War
1846 births
1929 deaths
People from Yates, New York
Burials at Arlington National Cemetery